The Panti Mountain bent-toed gecko (Cyrtodactylus pantiensis) is a species of gecko that is endemic to western Malaysia.

References 

Cyrtodactylus
Reptiles described in 2008